Jaipur is a village located in Motala Taluka of Buldhana district.

Demographics 
According to the 2011 census, the village population is 2516, including 1260 males and 1256 females. Literate people make up 1922, including 1022 males and 900 females. Workers number 1284, of which men make up 746 and women 538. 592 Cultivators divide into 397 men and 195 women. 388 people work in agricultural land as laborers, 232 men and 156 women.

About 538 houses are found in Jaipur.

History
Mirza Raje Jaisingh lived there for some time. The village was named Jaipur after Jaisingh.

Education
Jaipur has educational facilities from preschool to high school level. Tertiary educational institutions include:

M.P.M. School, Jaipur
Primary Urdu School, Jaipur
Raje Chhatrapati High School, Jaipur

Geography
Jaipur is a village in Motala taluka  of Buldhana district.

Notables 
 An ancient Stepwell was built by Mirza Raje Jaising.

 Jaipur village is famous for Rewadi.

 Aa paduka of Shri Sant Gajanan Maharaj.
 The temple and the mosque are adjacent to each other in Jaipur.

Climate 

References

Villages in Buldhana district